Agetec Inc. ("ASCII Game Entertainment Technology") is an American video game publishing company that is best known for bringing Japanese titles to the United States. The company was formed through ASCII Corporation, spinning off their American distribution subsidiary as an independent corporation in 1998, and became a standalone publisher one year later.

Notable games published by Agetec include R-Type Delta, Armored Core series, and the King's Field series, as well as the "designer series" RPG Maker and Fighter Maker. Other notable games published by Agetec include Magic Pengel and Cookie & Cream, the best selling fishing titles Bass Landing and Fisherman's Bass Club, and Disaster Report and its sequel, Raw Danger!. Most recently they developed Cookie & Cream with FromSoftware and published it in the United States. As of May 2018, many of the Agetec games that were formatted for the Nintendo ports were delisted or removed from the Nintendo eShop in North America.

Games published

References

External links 

Companies based in Sunnyvale, California
Video game companies established in 1998
Video game companies of the United States
Video game development companies
Video game publishers